Gridiron Victoria is the governing body for American football in the state of Victoria, Australia.

Formed in 1997, Gridiron Victoria was an amalgamation of the two existing governing bodies of the time, the Victoria Gridiron Football League and the Gridiron Association of Victoria.

Vic Bowl

The Vic Bowl is the Championship Game played between the two best teams in the men's Division One competition throughout the Gridiron Victoria season, whilst the best teams in the men's second division compete for the Division Two Championship.

The Junior Championship game is known as the Junior Vic Bowl, whilst the Women's Championship game is known as the Women's Vic Bowl.

The Monash Warriors are the most decorated Division One club with 11 Vic Bowls, their most recent in 2016 with a 16 - 12 win over the Western Crusaders.

The Pakenham Silverbacks have won the most Division Two Championships with 2, their most recent in 2016 with a 43 - 8 victory over the Northern Raiders.

The Croydon Rangers are the most successful Junior team with 6 titles, their most recent in 2012 with a 34 - 0 win over the Monash Warriors.

In the Women's division, the Western Crusaders and Geelong Buccaneers have both won 2 Women's Vic Bowls each.

Clubs
The following is a list of current and former teams competing in Gridiron Victoria.

Men's teams

 Ballarat Falcons based at Ballarat
 Bendigo Dragons based at Bendigo
 Croydon Rangers based at Croydon
 Casey Spartans based at Dandenong
 Geelong Buccaneers based at Geelong
 Melbourne University Royals based at Parkville
 Melton Wolves based at Melton
 Monash Warriors based in Clayton
 Northern Raiders based at Reservoir
 Pakenham Silverbacks based at Pakenham
 Peninsula Sharks based at Carrum Downs
 South Eastern Predators based at Cheltenham
 Western Crusaders based at Footscray

Women's teams

 Ballarat Kestrels based at Ballarat
 Croydon Rangers based at Croydon
 Melbourne Uni Chargers based at Parkville
 Melton Wolves based at Melton
 Northern Lady Raiders based at Reservoir
 Western Crusaders based at Footscray

Former women's teams
 Berwick Miners Diamonds based at Endeavour Hills
 Western Crusaders Western Foxes based at Footscray
 Pakenham Silverbacks based at Pakenham
 Geelong Buccaneers based at Geelong

Former men's teams
 Ballarat Pioneers based at Ballarat
 Bendigo Dragons: 1992-2002 Bendigo
 Berwick Miners based at Endeavour Hills
 Southern Seahawks based at Frankston
 Northern Blackhawks based at Fawkner
 Kew Colts based at Kew
 Southern Bulls based at Hampton
 Templestowe Thunder based at Templestowe
 Brighton Outlaws based at Brighton
 South Yarra Rams based at South Yarra
 Gippsland Gladiators based at Morwell
 Geelong Wildcats based at Geelong
 Frankston Sweathogs based at Frankston
 Doncaster Devils based at Doncaster
 Melbourne Hornets based at Fitzroy
 Westside Vikings based at Altona
 Lilydale Steelers based at Lilydale
 Banyule Panthers based at Greensborough
 Valley Pirates based at Greensborough
 Broadmeadows Cowboys based at Broadmeadows
 Moorabbin Raiders based at Oakleigh
 Waverley Sharks based at Waverley
 Subway Stealers
 Peninsular Razorbacks based in Mornington
 Hawthorn Hurricanes based in Hawthorn
 Dallas Cowboys based in Dallas

Image gallery

Championship Games

Men's Senior
Vic Bowl history, in the Victorian Gridiron Football League, and Gridiron Victoria Division One:

* Vicbowl XV was decided in Overtime (5 periods)

+ Vicbowl XXVIII was decided in Overtime (2 periods)

Women's Vic Bowl

Men's Senior Division Two

Championship games:

The Division Two season has been incorporated into the Division One schedule as of 2018

Junior championship games

Note: including history in Victorian Gridiron Football League and Gridiron Victoria:

(* Autumn season of 2003)
(** Spring season of 2003 : Two seasons were played in 2003 to re-align the senior season)

Gridiron Victoria State team results

Best & Fairest Trophy 

The Victorian Gridiron Officials Association Best & Fairest Trophy is a perpetual award, presented to the player who displays the highest levels of gridiron skill throughout the senior season together with high levels of fairness and sportsmanship encouraged by the rules of the sport.

Three, two and one votes are allocated by the officiating crews at the conclusion of each senior match and these are totalled at the end of the regular season allowing the recipient to be determined.

See also

Gridiron Australia

References

External links
Gridiron Victoria official site
 Western Crusaders
 Croydon Rangers
 Geelong Buccaneers
 Melbourne Uni Royals
 Monash Warriors / Monash Barbarians
 Northern Raiders
 Pakenham Silverbacks

Football in Victoria (Australia)
Sports governing bodies in Victoria (Australia)
Vic
Organizations established in 1997